"Gotta Go" is an R&B song written by Trey Songz, Troy Taylor and Marvin Eugene Smith and performed by American R&B singer-songwriter Trey Songz released as the second single from his debut album I Gotta Make It. Released on July 9, 2005 in North America. The song peaked at number 67 on the US Billboard Hot 100, and on the R&B charts at number 11, becoming his second Top 40 R&B hit.

Music video
The video also features a guest appearance by R&B singer Chris Brown.

Charts

Weekly charts

Year-end charts

Track listing
CD Single
(1799707; Released )
 "Gotta Go" (Radio Mix) — 3:08
 "Baby It's Time" — 3:50

References

2005 songs
2005 singles
Trey Songz songs
Songs written by Trey Songz
Song recordings produced by Troy Taylor (record producer)
Atlantic Records singles
Songs written by Troy Taylor (record producer)